Dorsum Arduino is a wrinkle-ridge at  in the border region between Oceanus Procellarum and Mare Imbrium on the Moon. It is 100 km long and was named after Italian geologist Giovanni Arduino in 1976.

References

External links
 

Ridges on the Moon
Mare Imbrium